Joshua Grenier (born July 16, 1979 in Manchester, New Hampshire) is a retired American soccer player. He played college soccer New Hampshire College (now Southern New Hampshire University) and Clayton State University. He last played for TuS Koblenz in Germany's second division, the 2. Bundesliga. He played as a central defender.

Grenier made over 100 competitive appearances for Koblenz from 2003 until 2008.

References

External links
 

1979 births
Living people
American expatriate soccer players
TuS Koblenz players
Expatriate footballers in Germany
Soccer players from New Hampshire
2. Bundesliga players
Association football defenders
American soccer players
Southern New Hampshire Penmen men's soccer players